The Official Chart is a long-running United Kingdom music chart programme, airing each Friday afternoon on BBC Radio 1.  It airs the UK Singles Chart compiled by the Official Charts Company.

In July 2015 The Official Chart moved from its traditional Sunday slot to Friday afternoons, to coincide with the global change in new music release dates from Sundays to Fridays. The chart airs between 16:00 and 17:45.

History 
Pick of the Pops, as the chart was originally known, transferred to Radio One from the BBC Light Programme in October 1967, along with host Alan Freeman. Tom Browne took over in 1972 with Solid Gold Sixty. This consisted of two hours featuring Radio One playlist tracks which were not in the Top 20 (broadcast on 247 metres Medium Wave and carried on VHF by some location BBC radio stations), followed by a one-hour Top 20 rundown from 6pm - 7pm (carried also on BBC Radio 2's FM transmitters). Starting from March 1974, the playlist tracks were incorporated into Paul Burnett's 'All There Is To Hear', and the Tom Browne show was reduced to just the Top 20 for one hour at 18:00.

In April 1978, Simon Bates took over as presenter. From May 1978, Radio One started promoting the Top 40 instead of the Top 30 in its Tuesday chart countdowns and daytime programming. This was because the Top 50 was increased to the BBC Top 75 that month.

From November 1978 the Sunday chart show was extended to a two-hour countdown of the entire top 40. At first, every record was played, but as there was insufficient time to play the whole of each record, during the 1980s some songs dropping in the chart were excluded. Tony Blackburn, who had been removed from weekday programming, hosted the show from 1979 to 1982.

From 6 January 1991, every song in the top 40 was played and in March 1992 the programme was extended to three hours to allow for each song again to be played in full. The programme now ran from 4pm until 7pm. Since then the show has had a variety of different names and presenters in guest and permanent roles.

The programme has run consistently every week, with the exceptions of 31 August 1997, 9 April 2021, and 9 September 2022 when it was cancelled as Radio 1 suspended programming due to the deaths of Diana, Princess of Wales, Prince Philip, Duke of Edinburgh, and Queen Elizabeth II respectively. The show was also sometimes shortened during coverage of BBC Radio 1's Big Weekend. Due to coverage of Gregathlon for Sport Relief 2016, the show on 12 February 2016 was presented by Scott Mills at the earlier time of 2 to 4pm.

In recent years the show has reflected changes in the music industry. In 2005 downloads began to be included as part of the top 40, and from July 2014 the show has also included audio streaming alongside physical sales.

Between February 2012 and August 2014 the show also streamed visually with music videos of the top 10 singles aired simultaneously on the Radio 1 website.

On 24 March 2015, it was announced that in July 2015 the show would be moving from a standalone show in its traditional Sunday night slot to a new position on Friday afternoons as part of Greg James' afternoon show. The move was due to an international agreement by the music industry to release all new albums and singles on Fridays. The new chart played the top 25 in full rather than the top 40 that had previously been broadcast. The change in presenter meant that Clara Amfo became the shortest-serving permanent host of the show. The Sunday night slot was replaced with a new show hosted by Cel Spellman and Katie Thistleton.

Since 17 February 2017, only the new entries and highest climbers from the top 40 are played with the top 10 played in full after 5 o’clock.

Presenters
The names in italics indicates a co-host for the show.

Notes

The Official Chart Update

Beginning on 10 March 2010, The Official Chart Update brand was launched giving an insight into the Official Singles Chart as it stands during the week. It originally aired on BBC Radio 1 on Wednesday afternoons hosted by Greg James, with a television version aired on MTV Music and MTV Hits.

In 2012 Scott Mills took over as host of The Official Chart Update with Jameela Jamil as co-host. Clara Amfo became the co-host of the show after Jamil left the show in early 2015. In mid-2015, Mills and Amfo left the show and James once again became the primary host of the show. Throughout the show's run Dev, Huw Stephens, and Matt Edmondson have filled in as cover presenters.

When the Official Chart moved to Fridays in July 2015, The Official Chart Update moved from Wednesdays to Mondays at 17:30 until 8 July 2019. The show was then replaced by The Official Chart: First Look.

Format
From its inception to 1 July 2015, several songs such as the re-entry(ies), new entry(ies), highest climbers and the Number 1 single were played in the show. The songs at 2–40 were mentioned briefly before playing the Number 1 single. Since 13 July 2015, the chart update is presented with the songs at 4–10 being mentioned briefly along with a short clip while the top 3 are played in full.

Presenters

The Official Chart: First Look 

The Official Chart: First Look is the show which provides the update on how the chart looks over the weekend. The show is on air during the historic Sunday slot but for one hour only, which is 6:00 - 7:00 pm, and hosted by Vick Hope and Katie Thistleton.

It replaces The Official Chart Update that was on air every Monday at 5:30 - 5:45 pm previously. It gives the fastest aggregated picture of the new week's biggest hits for the UK, reflecting popularity across the full spectrum of the Official Charts' sales and streams panel - including all of the UK's key download and streaming services, including Spotify, Amazon, Apple Music, iTunes, Deezer, Google and many more.

The show was launched on 14 July 2019. It focuses on the Top 20 biggest tracks from data collected on Friday and Saturday.

In September 2020, Vick Hope joined as the co-host of the show with Katie Thistleton. She replaced Cel Spellman as he focused on other acting and broadcasting work, even though the station says he will remain as a part of the Radio 1 family.

Presenters

See also 
 Timeline of chart shows on UK radio

References

External links

BBC Radio 1 programmes
British music radio programmes
1967 radio programme debuts